Francesco Maria Richini (also spelled Ricchini) (9 February 1584 – 24 April 1658) was an Italian Baroque architect.

Biography
He was born in Milan and trained under Lorenzo Binago. He was patronized by Cardinal Federico Borromeo, Archbishop of Milan. After a stint in Rome, he became capomastro under the main architect of the Cathedral of the city, Aurelio Trezzi, in 1605. He was elevated to the latter's position himself from 1631 to 1638.

Like his famous elder cousin, Carlo Borromeo, author of a guide to religious architecture, Federico Borromeo promulgated classical or antique models. In Richini he found a deviation to the Baroque, as exemplified by his churches of Santa Maria alla Porta and of San Giuseppe. This small church in central Milan (consecrated 1616) has a highly decorated facade (finished 1630) with volutes. The interior is two Bramante-inspired squares.

He also worked on the palazzos of Brera (1627–1628), Annoni (1631), Litta (1642–1648), and Durini (1648). He contributed to the design of the courtyard of the Ospedale Maggiore (1625–1649), in collaboration with Giovan Battista Messina, Fabio Mangone and Giovanni Battista Crespi. He also designed the concave facade for the Collegio Elvetico, and also for the Collegio Borromeo in Pavia and the Ducal Palace of the Certosa di Pavia (1625). He helped in the construction of Sant'Alessandro in Zebedia in Milan. He designed the "Altar of Our Lady of the Assumption" in the Como Cathedral, a work that lasted several decades and was completed in 1686.

His son, Gian Domenico, was also an architect. Richini is said to have been an early influence of Francesco Borromini.

References

Notes

1584 births
1658 deaths
Italian Baroque architects
17th-century Italian architects
Architects from Milan